Cora applanata is a species of basidiolichen in the family Hygrophoraceae. It was formally described as a new species in 2016 by Bibiana Moncada, Edier Soto-Medina, and Robert Lücking. The specific epithet refers to its applanate (flattened) thallus. The lichen is widely distributed in tropical montane areas of the northern Andes, where it grows on soil along open road banks and on land slides.

References

applanata
Lichen species
Lichens described in 2016
Lichens of South America
Taxa named by Robert Lücking
Basidiolichens